Stéphane Patrick Porato (born 19 September 1973) is a French former professional footballer who played as a goalkeeper.

Career
In his country Porato represented Sporting Toulon, AS Monaco FC, Olympique de Marseille (where he played in the 1999 UEFA Cup Final), US Créteil-Lusitanos and AC Ajaccio, mainly as a backup or starting in the second division. On 13 November 1999 he earned his sole cap for France, appearing in a 3–0 friendly win with Croatia.

In late October 2006, as he had already moved to Spain with second level's Deportivo Alavés, following Ajaccio's relegation from Ligue 1, Porato had a trial at Chelsea in view of signing as third-choice after the long-term skull injury to Petr Čech. Eventually, nothing came of it.

Porato joined Xerez CD, in the same country and tier, for the 2007–08 season. A starter in his first year, he lost the job in the following as the Andalusians achieved a first-ever La Liga promotion, being released in July 2009.

Honours
 Trophée des Champions: 2000

References

External links

 
 

1973 births
Living people
Sportspeople from Colombes
Footballers from Hauts-de-Seine
French footballers
Association football goalkeepers
Ligue 1 players
Ligue 2 players
SC Toulon players
AS Monaco FC players
Olympique de Marseille players
US Créteil-Lusitanos players
AC Ajaccio players
Segunda División players
Deportivo Alavés players
Xerez CD footballers
France international footballers
French expatriate footballers
Expatriate footballers in Spain
French expatriate sportspeople in Spain
French beach soccer players